Athos ([ˈæθɒs] Greek:), in Greek mythology, was one of the Gigantes. He is best known for the creation of Mount Athos, a mountain and peninsula in northern Greece which is an important centre of Eastern Orthodox monasticism, and thus called , 'Holy Mountain'.

There are two versions of the creation myth of the mountain. In one version, Athos throws a mountain at Poseidon but misses. It is said that "Athos got away and the rock he was about to throw at the god slipped through his fingers". Poseidon then threw it back at him, thus creating Mount Athos. In the other version, Poseidon throws a rock at Athos, creating the mountain.

Sources
 “Gigantes.” Accessed September 14, 2015. https://web.archive.org/web/20151001095553/http://www.mlahanas.de/Greeks/Mythology/Gigantes.html.
 “GIGANTES : Giants of Phlegra | Greek Mythology, W/ Pictures.” Accessed September 14, 2015. http://www.theoi.com/Gigante/Gigantes.html.
 “Gigantomachy: Sculpture & Vase Representations.” Accessed September 21, 2015. https://web.archive.org/web/20130208175042/http://mkatz.web.wesleyan.edu/cciv110x/hesiod/cciv110.gigantomachy.html.
 “HOLY MOUNTAIN AND BULGARIAN ZOGRAF MONASTERY.” Accessed September 21, 2015. http://berberian11.tripod.com/gulabov_athos.htm.
 “Mount Athos.” Sacred Sites. Accessed September 21, 2015. https://sacredsites.com/europe/greece/mount_athos.html.
 “Mount Athos - Everything2.com.” Accessed September 21, 2015. http://everything2.com/title/Mount+Athos.
 “Myths and Legends about Mount Athos.” Accessed September 21, 2015. https://web.archive.org/web/20151001153446/http://europost.bg/article?id=968.
 “Tsantali » Mount Athos.” Accessed September 16, 2015. http://www.tsantali.com/mount-athos/.

Gigantes
Mythology of Macedonia (region)
Greek legendary creatures
Mount Athos